Feng Yi (?- A.D. 34) was a Chinese general of the Eastern Han Dynasty, who helped Emperor Guangwu of Han establish the Eastern Han dynasty. One of his greatest contributions was the final defeat of the Red Eyebrows rebels.

He was famous for his modest character; he would sit under a tree while other generals received rewards for their conquests.  For this reason, he was called The Big Tree General. Emperor Guangwu's son Emperor Ming of Han later honored 28 men who had served his father well by painting their portraits on a palace tower; these men became known as the 28 generals of Yuntai. Feng's portrait was placed in the 7th position.

Han dynasty generals from Henan
Year of birth unknown
Han dynasty politicians from Henan
Generals from Henan